Aquacade may refer to:

Billy Rose's Aquacade, aquatic show
Rhyolite/Aquacade, US reconnaissance satellite program
 Aquacade (show)